Achromobacter lyticus is a Gram-negative bacterium from the genus Achromobacter. The enzyme lysyl endopeptidase was isolated from A. lyticus.

References 

Burkholderiales
Bacteria described in 1972